Government Medical College, Palakkad, also known as Institute of Integrated Medical Science (IIMS) is a medical college established in Palakkad District on 2014 by Government of Kerala, under the management of Kerala State Scheduled Caste Development Department. The institute is affiliated to Kerala University of Health Sciences (KUHS).

See also
 List of medical colleges in India

References

External links 
 Official website

Medical colleges in Kerala
Palakkad
Universities and colleges in Palakkad
2014 establishments in Kerala
Educational institutions established in 2014